Scharwoude is the name of several places in the Netherlands, all in the province of North Holland:

 Scharwoude, Langedijk, a former municipality
 Noord-Scharwoude and Zuid-Scharwoude, towns in the municipality Langedijk
 Scharwoude (Koggenland), a small village and former municipality